Loulad  is a town in Morocco. It is situated in the region of Casablanca-Settat.

Demographics

See also

Sources 
  Loulad at the site of World Gazetteer, by Stefan Helders
  Loulad on the site of Falling Rain Genomics, Inc.

References

Populated places in Settat Province
Municipalities of Morocco